Melbourne Ska Orchestra are an ARIA Award-winning Australian ska band formed in 2003 in Melbourne. The group has up to 34 members, and is led by bandleader Nicky Bomba, formerly of the John Butler Trio. The band are signed to FOUR FOUR, an imprint of ABC Music.

Background
Drawing inspiration from the vast musical legends that have shaped the Ska genre, from the Jamaican movement through to UK Two Tone and the present day Latino Ska, Melbourne Ska Orchestra demonstrate a unique Australian vision with the exuberance and freewheeling colour of contemporary Ska. The outfit have crafted their sound with unexpected arrangements and seductive harmonies, powerful horns and foot-stomping drums.

The eponymous Melbourne Ska Orchestra album was released to rave reviews in 2013 and picked up 2 ARIA nominations that year.

The band have toured consistently for over a decade, including festival appearances at Bluesfest, Golden Plains, Vivid, Caloundra, Queenscliff and AWME. In addition to their highly visible presence on the Australian touring circuit, the band have built an impressive, ever-growing and dedicated overseas fan base. The band sold out their debut London show, appeared on the bill for the iconic Glastonbury Festival and played a headline set to a crowd 50,000 at the Montreal Jazz Festival during their 2014 tour. The band has performed in Australia, New Zealand, United Kingdom, USA, Canada, Turkey as well as appearing in television commercials in Australia and Japan.

The band released their second album Sierra Kilo Alpha in April 2016, embarking on a national tour to support it.

Sierra Kilo Alpha won the 2016 ARIA Award for Best World Music Album.

The band released a follow up to their acclaimed 2016 release called Saturn Return in late 2016. Saturn Return comprises a selection of songs from the same recording session as Sierra Kilo Alpha and was released on a rocket-shaped USB drive.

In 2018, the band announced that they would release one song every week (each Friday, hence "52 Fridays") for an entire year. At the end of 2019, the entire 52-week series of single releases was successfully concluded with the song "Magnolia Springtime". The resulting collection, One Year of Ska, won the ARIA Award for Best World Music Album in 2019.

Discography

Studio albums

Live albums

Compilation albums

Awards

ARIA Awards

Melbourne Ska Orchestra has been nominated for five Australian Recording Industry Association (ARIA) Music Awards, winning Best World Music Album in 2016 and 2019.

|-
| 2013 || Nicky Bomba and Robin Mai - Melbourne Ska Orchestra || Engineer of the Year || 
|-
| 2013 || Melbourne Ska Orchestra || Best Blues & Roots Album ||  
|-
| 2014 || The Diplomat Tour || Best Australian Live Act||  
|-
| 2016 || Sierra Kilo Alpha || Best World Music Album||  
|-
| 2017 || Saturn Return || Best World Music Album ||  
|-
| 2018 || Ska Classics || Best World Music Album ||  
|-
| 2019 || One Year of Ska || Best World Music Album ||  
|-
| 2020 || Live at the Triffid || Best World Music Album ||

Music Victoria Awards
The Music Victoria Awards are an annual awards night celebrating Victorian music. They commenced in 2006.

! 
|-
| 2013
| Melbourne Ska Orchestra
| Best Global or Reggae Act
| 
|rowspan="3"|  
|-
| 2016|| Melbourne Ska Orchestra || Best Global or Reggae Act || 
|-
| 2018|| Melbourne Ska Orchestra || Best Global or Reggae Act || 
|-

References

External links 
 

Musical groups established in 2003
Musical groups from Melbourne
Australian ska groups